Joanna Furhman (born 1972) is an American poet and professor. She is the author of six collections of poems and her poems have appeared in literary magazines and journals, as well as in anthologies. Fuhrman is a member of the Alice James Books Cooperative Board, and poetry editor for Boog City, a community newspaper for the Lower East Side in New York.

Life 
She is a graduate of the University of Washington MFA program.  In the past, she taught creative writing in public schools through Poets House. She is currently the Teaching Instructor and Coordinator of Instruction to Creative Writing at Rutgers University.  She also teaches creative writing at Sarah Lawrence College's Writing Village, and in libraries through the Teachers & Writers Collaborative. She lives in Brooklyn with her husband, the playwright Robert Kerr.

Fuhrman has also participated in The Sanctuary Project, a concert held by Lunatics at Large.

Published works

Collections 

The Year of Yellow Butterflies (Hanging Loose Press, 2015) 
Pageant (Alice James Books, 2009) 
 Moraine (Hanging Loose Press, 2006) 
 Ugh Ugh Ocean (Hanging Loose Press, 2003) 
 Freud in Brooklyn (Hanging Loose Press, 2000) 
 To a New Era (Hanging Loose Press, 2021)  ISBN  978-1934909690

Select poems 

 "Return to Normalcy"
"Glimpsing John Berryman Reborn as a Hasid"

References

External links

 
 Video: Joanna Fuhrman Reading
 Biography: Teachers & Writers Collaborative – Writer > Joanna Fuhrman

Poets from New York (state)
University of Washington alumni
Writers from Brooklyn
Living people
1972 births
Rutgers University faculty
American women poets
21st-century American poets
American women academics
21st-century American women writers